"Stand My Ground" is the first single from Dutch band Within Temptation's album The Silent Force. The song is also included on the US edition of the band's 2007 album The Heart of Everything. It became a top 10 hit in three countries (the Netherlands, Belgium and Finland) and became a top 40 hit in four other countries. It was also used in the trailer for the film Blood & Chocolate.

Along with their earlier singles "Ice Queen" and "Mother Earth", "Stand My Ground" has become one of the band's signature songs and is performed on their set of almost every concert since its release.

Track listing

Video
The video was shot in Berlin and was released two weeks before the single release. The video became a superclip at the Dutch music station TMF, which means it was played every hour for a week.

Reception
The song was successful in the Netherlands reaching the number four spot but was also the most successful song after "Ice Queen" in Europe. It went top ten in also Belgium and Finland and became a number 13 hit in Germany. Although there was no sign of the song in the official Spanish chart, it topped the Spanish Airplay Chart and Los 40 Principales.

Charts

Weekly charts

Year-end charts

Chart performance

References

Within Temptation songs
2004 singles
Songs written by Sharon den Adel
Songs written by Robert Westerholt
Songs written by Martijn Spierenburg
2004 songs
Roadrunner Records singles